Gulsara Dadabayeva (Cyrillic Гулсара Дадабаева; born 4 July 1976 in Dushanbe) is a retired Tajikistani long-distance runner who competed primarily in the marathon. She represented her country at the 1996, 2000 and 2004 Summer Olympics, as well as four World Championships. She was the first woman to represent Tajikistan at the Olympics.

Competition record

Personal bests
Outdoor
3000 metres – 10:29.69 (Stuttgart 1993)
5000 metres – 18:50.8 (Dushanbe 1996) NR
10,000 metres – 39:04.59 (Lisbon 1994) NR
Half marathon – 1:19:08 (Brussels 2002) NR
Marathon – 2:39:03 (Ljubljana 2003) NR

Indoor
1500 metres – 4:36.8 (Rasht 2001) NR
3000 metres – 10:41.43 (Barcelona 1995)

References

External links

1976 births
Living people
People from Dushanbe
Tajikistani female long-distance runners
Tajikistani female marathon runners
Female marathon runners
Olympic athletes of Tajikistan
Athletes (track and field) at the 1996 Summer Olympics
Athletes (track and field) at the 2000 Summer Olympics
Athletes (track and field) at the 2004 Summer Olympics
Athletes (track and field) at the 1998 Asian Games
Athletes (track and field) at the 2002 Asian Games
World Athletics Championships athletes for Tajikistan
Asian Games competitors for Tajikistan